Ray Curry is an American trade union leader. Since July 2021, Curry has served as President of the United Autoworkers. He was elected by the UAW International Executive Board (IEB), replacing Rory Gamble, who was the first Black president of the union. Curry is the second Black president. Curry had previously served as Secretary-Treasurer from 2018 to 2021.

Curry received a Bachelor of Science in business administration/finance from the University of North Carolina at Charlotte and a Master of Business Administration from the University of Alabama. He joined the UAW when he worked as an assembler at Freightliner Trucks in Mount Holly, North Carolina. In 2004, he was hired by the union directly as a staffer.

References

1965 births
Living people
Presidents of the United Auto Workers
African-American trade unionists
Trade unionists from North Carolina
University of North Carolina at Charlotte alumni
University of Alabama alumni
21st-century African-American people
20th-century African-American people